Staurogyne repens is a plant in the family Acanthaceae, native to Brazil and Guyana. It was formally known as Ebermaiera repens. It is widely used as a tropical aquarium plant, where it grows as a bright green carpet at the bottom of the tank.

References

Flora of South America
Aquatic plants
repens